Luís Filipe Fraga Oliveira (born 27 May 1983), better known by his stage name Lucenzo, is a Portuguese–French reggaeton recording artist and record producer. His parents emigrated to France, from Portugal. Lucenzo, when began his singing career, signed with the Universal Music record label, to which he is still today. He is best known for his dance hit with rapper Big Ali, "Vem dançar Kuduro". Puerto Rican reggaeton artist Don Omar released a Spanish/Portuguese version of the song under the title "Danza Kuduro" with Lucenzo.

Career
Lucenzo released his debut single in 2008, a Portuguese/multilingual reggae/reggaeton song entitled "Emigrante del mundo". Signed to Scopio Music, the song became a Portuguese radio hit.  It was followed in 2009 by "Dame reggaeton". But it was with his bilingual English/Portuguese dance hit "Vem Dançar Kuduro" in collaboration with Big Ali produced by Lucenzo. It was a Top 40 hit in Switzerland, reaching #31. An alternative Spanish version by Don Omar with Lucenzo was released on 15 August 2010, entitled "Danza Kuduro". The accompanying music video was released on 17 August 2010. It is also featured on Don Omar's compilation album Meet the Orphans.

On July 1, 2015, Lucenzo released a new song "Vida Louca" in Portuguese and reserved to the Lusophone marker. It was part of a series of compilations VIDISCO and available on iTunes Portugal. At the end of July 2015, Lucenzo started promoting his single in Portugal and was invited to several televisions including SIC, RTP, TVi giving interviews where he explained that he wanted to book the premiere of his new work in Portugal before presenting it internationally in Spanish.

Discography

Studio albums

Singles as lead artist

*Did not appear in the official Belgian Ultratop 50 charts, but rather in the bubbling under Ultratip charts.

Songs featured in

Notes

Although the U.S. Billboard Hot 100 chart comprise up to a hundred songs, the Bubbling Under Hot 100 Singles act as an extension to each chart. Thus, songs that have peaked up to these extension charts are listed in this discography under the Hot 100 with values over a hundred.

Awards

2011
 Latin Billboard
 Latin Rhythm Airplay: Danza Kuduro (Don Omar featuring Lucenzo)

2012 
 Latin Billboard
 Latin Song of the Year (Vocal event): Danza Kuduro (Don Omar featuring Lucenzo)
 Latin Rhythm Airplay: Danza Kuduro (Don Omar featuring Lucenzo)
 Digital Song of the Year: Danza Kuduro (Don Omar featuring Lucenzo)

 American Billboard
 Top Latin Song: Danza Kuduro (Don Omar featuring Lucenzo)

References

External links
 Official Website
 

21st-century Portuguese male singers
Living people
1983 births
Portuguese-language singers
French Roman Catholics
Musicians from Bordeaux
French people of Portuguese descent
21st-century French male singers